The Silent Force Tour was a concert tour by Dutch symphonic metal band Within Temptation in support of their third album, The Silent Force. The international growth the band had been facing with the album reflected well on the touring schedule and the locations played, as the band started being able to play in several newly visited countries and at bigger music festivals, such as the Download Festival in the United Kingdom, Wacken Open Air in Germany and the Loud Park Festival in Japan. The concert at the Java-eiland, in Amsterdam, was recorded and released homonymously under the name The Silent Force Tour on November, 2005.

Background
Within Temptation's third album, The Silent Force, was released on 15 November 2004. The album was an instant number one debut on the band's homecountry and charted well in many other European countries. In support of the release they embarked on another large international tour in 2005, with dates across Europe and a one-off show in Dubai and another in Japan. A special concert at the Java-eiland, Netherlands, was recorded and released as a DVD, entitled The Silent Force Tour. The concert included special guests, as old Within Temptation members in some songs. The band also showed heavy presence at summer music festivals, including their first presentation at the Download Festival in the United Kingdom and also headlining the 2005 edition of the also British Bloodstock Open Air.

Setlist

Songs that were often played during the tour
 Intro (from The Silent Force, 2004)
 See Who I Am (from The Silent Force, 2004)
 Jillian (I'd Give My Heart) (from The Silent Force, 2004)
 Stand My Ground (from The Silent Force, 2004)
 Forsaken (from The Silent Force, 2004)
 Angels (from The Silent Force, 2004)
 Memories (from The Silent Force, 2004)
 Mother Earth (from Mother Earth, 2001)
 Ice Queen (from Mother Earth, 2001)
 Caged (from Mother Earth, 2001)
 The Promise (from Mother Earth, 2001)
 Deceiver of Fools (from Mother Earth, 2001)
 Running Up That Hill (from Running Up That Hill, 2003)

Songs that were occasionally added to the setlists
 Restless (from Enter, 1997)
 Candles (from Enter, 1997)
 The Other Half (of Me) (from The Dance, 1997)
 Our Farewell (from Mother Earth, 2001)
 Dark Wings (from Mother Earth, 2001)
 Jane Doe (from Mother Earth (b-side), 2001)
 Pale (from The Silent Force, 2004)
 Aquarius (from The Silent Force, 2004)
 It's The Fear (from The Silent Force, 2004)
 A Dangerous Mind (from The Silent Force (b-side), 2004)
 The Howling (from The Heart of Everything, 2007, unreleased at the time)
 "Somewhere" and "Towards the End" (from The Silent Force, 2004) were played once, at the Java Eiland concert.

Special setlists

Tour dates

 A Official recording of The Silent Force Tour DVD.
 B Special presentation at The Chronicles of Spellborn game release.

Personnel

Within Temptation
Sharon den Adel – vocals
Robert Westerholt – rhythm guitar
Ruud Jolie – lead guitar
Martijn Spierenburg – keyboards
Jeroen van Veen – bass guitar
Stephen van Haestregt – drums

References

2004 concert tours
2005 concert tours
2006 concert tours
Concert tours of Europe
Within Temptation concert tours